James Farquharson Remnant, 1st Baron Remnant,  (13 February 1862 – 30 January 1933), known as Sir James Remnant, 1st Baronet, from 1917 to 1928, was a British Conservative politician.

Biography
Remnant was the son of Frederick William Remnant of Southwold, Suffolk. He was educated at Harrow School and at Magdalen College, Oxford (1880–83), and was called to the Bar at Lincoln's Inn in 1886. From 1892 to 1901 he represented Holborn in the London County Council as a Moderate, and was chairman of the Theatres Committee of the council.

He was elected unopposed to the House of Commons at a by-election in March 1900 as the member of parliament (MP) for Holborn, a seat he held until 1928. He never held ministerial office but was a member of the Select Committee on Taxation of Land Value (Scotland) in 1904, of the Royal Commission on Canals and Inland Navigation from 1906 to 1910, of the Select Committee on Police Day of Rest from 1908 to 1909, of the Home Office Committee on Conditions and Pay of Police in 1919 and of the Rating Machinery Committee in 1924. Remnant was created a Baronet, of Wenhaston in the County of Suffolk, in July 1917 and following his retirement from the House of Commons, on 26 June 1928 he was raised to the peerage as Baron Remnant, of Wenhaston in the County of Suffolk.

Remnant married in 1892 Frances Emily Gosling, daughter of Robert Gosling. He died in January 1933, aged 70, and was succeeded in his titles by his eldest son Robert. Lady Remnant died in 1944.

Notes

References
Kidd, Charles, Williamson, David (editors). Debrett's Peerage and Baronetage (1990 edition). New York: St Martin's Press, 1990,

External links 
 

1862 births
1933 deaths
Barons in the Peerage of the United Kingdom
Conservative Party (UK) MPs for English constituencies
UK MPs 1900–1906
UK MPs 1906–1910
UK MPs 1910
UK MPs 1910–1918
UK MPs 1922–1923
UK MPs 1923–1924
UK MPs 1924–1929
UK MPs who were granted peerages
People educated at Harrow School
Alumni of Magdalen College, Oxford
Commanders of the Order of the British Empire
Members of London County Council
People from Suffolk Coastal (district)
Barons created by George V